Roger Palmer may refer to:
 Roger Palmer, 1st Earl of Castlemaine (1634–1705), English courtier, diplomat and MP, 1660
 Roger Palmer (MP), English MP at various times between 1624 and 1644
 Roger Palmer (footballer) (born 1959)
 Sir Roger Palmer, 5th Baronet, Member of the UK Parliament for Mayo, 1857–1865